Thomas Frank Lynch (born May 24, 1955 in Chicago, Illinois) is a former American football guard in the National Football League for the Seattle Seahawks and the Buffalo Bills. Lynch played college football at Boston College.

References

External links
NFL.com player page

1955 births
Living people
Players of American football from Chicago
American football offensive guards
Boston College Eagles football players
Seattle Seahawks players
Buffalo Bills players